The 9th Annual Japan Record Awards took place at the Shibuya Public Hall in Shibuya, Tokyo, on December 16, 1967, starting at 02:30PM JST. Jackey Yoshikawa and His Blue Comets become the first group sounds that receive the JRA.

Emcee
Ayurou Miki
3rd time as the emcee for JRA.

Award Winners
Japan Record Award
 Jackey Yoshikawa & His Blue Comets for "Blue Chateau" 
 Lyricist: Jun Hashimoto
 Composer: Daisuke Inoue
 Arranger: Kenichirou Morioka
 Record Company: Columbia Records/Nippon Columbia

Vocalist Award
 Hiroshi Mizuhara for "Kimi Koso Waga Inochi" 
 Awarded JRA at 8 years ago, 2nd award.
 Yukari Itou for "Koyubi No Omoide" 

New Artist Award
 Hitoshi Nagai for "Koibito To Yonde Mitai" 
 Naomi Sagara for "Sekkai Wa Futari No Tameni" 

Lyricist Award
 Rei Nakanishi for "Kiri No Kanatani" and "Koi No Fugue" 
 Singer: Jun Mayuzumi, The Peanuts

Composer Award
 Masaaki Hirao for "Kiri No Mashūga" and "Nagisa No Signorina"
 Singer: Akira Fuse, Michiyo Azusa

Arranger Award
 Takeshi Terauchi for "Let's Go Unmei" and other arrangements.
 Singer: Takeshi Terauchi & Bunnies

Planning Award
 King Records for "Uta To Oto De Tsuzuru Meiji"
 Awarded again after 3 years, 2nd planning award.

Children's Song Award
 Suginami Junior Chorus for "Utau Hashi No Uta"

Special Award
 Yūjirō Ishihara

References

Japan Record Awards
Japan Record Awards
Japan Record Awards
Japan Record Awards
1967